An affinity credit card program allows an organization to offer its members and supporters—those who have an "affinity" for that organization—a credit card branded with the organization's brand and imagery. An affinity credit card program may pay the brand owning organization a bonus for each new account generated, plus a percentage of every transaction charged to the card. In some cases the brand-owning organization will form a revenue and profit sharing joint venture on a 50/50 basis. The venture is funded by the interchange income from the card scheme such as MasterCard or Visa, fees, charges and credit lent to cardholders.

Affinity credit cards are offered by many retailers, shopping centers, airlines, universities, alumni associations, sports teams, professional associations and others, and increasingly by small and mid-sized nonprofits and membership-based groups that rely on these programs for incremental revenue.

External links

Investopedia article about Affinity cards

Credit card terminology